Events from the year 1822 in Denmark.

Incumbents
 Monarch – Frederick VI

Events
28 February – Spare- og Laanekassen i Marstal, a savings bank on the island of Ørø, is founded by a group of local residents.

Culture

Music
 Carl Nielsen's Wind Quintet is performed in public for the first time.

Births
 6 April – August Ferdinand Michael van Mehren, philologist (died 1907)
 24 April – Henrik August Flindt, gardener and landscape architect (died 1901)
 17 June – Erik Bøgh, journalist, playwright and songwriter (died 1899)
 4 July – Vilhelm Christesen, silver smith (died 1899)
 2 August – Ida Marie Bille, court member (died 1902)
 15 August – Carl Frederik Blixen-Finecke, politician and nobleman (died 1873 in Germany)

Date unknown
 Georg Grothe, composer (died 1876)

Deaths
 6 January – John Christmas, businessman (born 1757 in England)
 4 May – Hedevig Johanne Bagger, businesswoman (born 1740)
 20 May – Otto Fabricius, missionary, naturalist, ethnographer and explorer (born 1744)

References

 
1820s in Denmark
Denmark
Years of the 19th century in Denmark